William Charles Rogers (born September 10, 1951) is an American professional golfer who is best known as the winner of the 1981 Open Championship.

Rogers was born in Waco, Texas. He attended Texarkana, Texas High School where he excelled on the golf team. He began honing his skills at Northridge Country Club winning numerous local amateur events in northeast Texas. His father was a lieutenant colonel in the United States Air Force, and Rogers spent part of his military brat youth in Morocco and Germany. Rogers began playing golf at age nine and later attended the University of Houston, where he played on the Cougar golf team and roomed with fellow future PGA Tour pro Bruce Lietzke. As an amateur golfer, he played for the U.S. in the 1973 Walker Cup.

Rogers played the PGA Tour full-time from 1975 to 1988 and won six tournaments, including four in 1981. Almost uniquely for an American golfer, his two most notable victories were in Britain: Rogers won the Suntory World Match Play Championship at Wentworth in 1979, and The Open Championship in 1981 at Royal St George's, four strokes ahead of runner-up Bernhard Langer. He was the PGA Player of the Year for 1981, and finished second on McCormack's World Golf Rankings; he was also on the Ryder Cup team in 1981.

In 1982, Rogers won the PGA Grand Slam of Golf, and led the U.S. Open during the final day before falling short. After one further PGA Tour win in 1983, Rogers' tour career faded to the point where he experienced burnout; He told the Independent that "it got to a point in the mid 1980's that the golf course was the last place I'd rather be." 

Rogers left the tour in 1988 and took a position as director of golf at San Antonio Country Club, where he worked for 11 years.

Since turning 50 in 2001, Rogers has played sporadically on the Champions Tour; his most notable accomplishment as a senior player was winning the team portion of the 2002 Liberty Mutual Legends of Golf with Bruce Lietzke.

Rogers lives in San Antonio, Texas.

Amateur wins
this list may be incomplete
1972 Southern Amateur

Professional wins (14)

PGA Tour wins (6)

PGA Tour playoff record (1–2)

Japan Golf Tour wins (3)

PGA Tour of Australasia wins (2)

Other wins (2)

Other senior wins (1)
2002 Liberty Mutual Legends of Golf – Raphael Division (with Bruce Lietzke)

Major championships

Wins (1)

Results timeline

CUT = missed the halfway cut
WD = withdrew
"T" indicates a tie for a place.

Summary

Most consecutive cuts made – 17 (1978 Masters – 1982 PGA)
Longest streak of top-10s – 2 (1981 U.S. Open – 1981 Open Championship)

U.S. national team appearances
Amateur
Walker Cup: 1973 (winners)

Professional
Ryder Cup: 1981 (winners)

See also 

 1974 PGA Tour Qualifying School graduates

References

External links

American male golfers
Houston Cougars men's golfers
PGA Tour golfers
PGA Tour Champions golfers
Ryder Cup competitors for the United States
Winners of men's major golf championships
Sportspeople from Waco, Texas
Golfers from San Antonio
1951 births
Living people